Earl Lawson (February 1, 1923 – January 14, 2003) was an American sportswriter for newspapers in Cincinnati, Ohio.  He covered the Cincinnati Reds from 1949 to 1984 and was inducted into the "writers wing" of the National Baseball Hall of Fame and Museum in 1985.

In 1949, Lawson first began covering the Cincinnati Reds for the Cincinnati Times-Star.  He was the beat reporter for the Reds at the Times-Star from 1951 to 1958 and at The Cincinnati Post from 1958 to 1984.  Lawson had a series of run-ins with the Reds in his early year as a beat reporter covering the team.  In June 1953, manager Rogers Hornsby barred Lawson from the locker room after Lawson questioned Hornsby's decision not to replace a pitcher. In June 1957, Lawson got into a fight with Reds' second baseman Johnny Temple after a game in which Lawson, who also served as official scorer, charged Temple with a fielding error.  Temple reportedly greeted Lawson with a "blistering barrage of profanity" and knocked Lawson to the ground before other players separated them.  In June 1962, Reds' star outfielder Vada Pinson punched Lawson on the chin after Lawson wrote an article criticizing the Reds for lackadaisical fielding. Lawson joked to fellow reporters that, based on first-hand knowledge, Pinson was a harder puncher than Temple.  After a second incident in September 1963 in which Pinson allegedly grabbed Lawson by the neck and pushed him against a wall, Lawson filed assault and battery charges against Pinson.  A trial in December 1963 result in a hung jury. He was also a correspondent for The Sporting News for many years and wrote for The Saturday Evening Post during its days of using iconic Norman Rockwell covers.  In 1976, he was elected as the president of the Baseball Writers' Association of America.

In 1985, Lawson was honored by the Baseball Writers' Association of America with the J. G. Taylor Spink Award for distinguished baseball writing.  Recipients of the Spink Award are recognized at the National Baseball Hall of Fame and Museum in what is commonly referred to as the "writers wing" of the Hall of Fame.

In 1987, Lawson published his autobiography, Cincinnati Seasons: My 34 Years With the Reds.  Lawson wrote in his autobiography that he had been able to live like a millionaire while being paid to do it.  He recalled that he had "mingled with the sports celebrities of the world and formed friendships that I'll cherish forever ... I was a baseball writer."

Lawson moved to Sacramento, California, in 2000 to live with his daughter, Lisa Helene Lawson (Damron). In January 2003, he died of cancer and was interred in Arlington National Cemetery July 3, 2003.

Selected articles by Lawson
Gary Nolan: The Confidence Kid (Gary Nolan), Baseball Digest, May 1969
No More Eccentric Capers for Carbo (Bernie Carbo), Baseball Digest, July 1970
Anatomy of an Arm Problem (Don Gullett), Baseball Digest, December 1976
Pete Rose Recalls Career Highlights in Each Park (Pete Rose), Baseball Digest, September 1977
Ed Kranepool: Last of the Original Mets (Ed Kranepool), Baseball Digest, September 1979
Gaylord Perry: Next in Line to Win 300 Games (Gaylord Perry), Baseball Digest, August 1981
Memories of Major League Spring Training in the 1950s, Baseball Digest, May 1992
Memories of a Younger Sparky Anderson (Sparky Anderson), Baseball Digest, August 1992
Reds' Relief Corps Has Been Populated by 'Free Spirits' (Pedro Borbón/Ryne Duren), Baseball Digest, November 1992
How Injuries Shortened Careers of 4 Reds Pitchers (Jim Maloney, Gary Nolan, Don Gullett, Wayne Simpson), Baseball Digest, May 1993
Joe Nuxhall Recalls Last Time He Faced Stan Musial (Joe Nuxhall), Baseball Digest, July 1996

References

Baseball writers
Writers from Cincinnati
1923 births
2003 deaths
Burials at Arlington National Cemetery
BBWAA Career Excellence Award recipients